The French scale, French gauge or Charrière system is commonly used to measure the size of a catheter. It is most often abbreviated as Fr, but can often be seen abbreviated as Fg, FR or F. It may also be abbreviated as CH or Ch (for Charrière, its inventor). However, simply gauge, G or GA generally refers to Birmingham gauge.

The Charrière is measured by the ''outer'' diameter, and is defined as 1 Fr = 1/3 mm, and thus 1 mm = 3 Fr;  therefore the diameter of a round catheter in millimetres can be determined by dividing the French size by 3., 

For example, if the French size is 9, the diameter is 9/3 = 3.0; mm. It is seen that the French unit is fully redundant with the metric system but introduces potential for rounding errors. This metrication problem is further complicated by the mixed use of metric and imperial units in medical professions using catheters. 

An increasing French size corresponds to a larger external diameter. This is contrary to Birmingham gauge, where an increasing gauge corresponds to a smaller diameter needle.

The French size is a measure of the outer diameter of a catheter (not internal drainage channel, or inner diameter). So, for example, if a two-way catheter of 20 Fr is compared to a 20 Fr three-way catheter, they both have the same external diameter but the two-way catheter will have a larger drainage channel than the three-way. Three-way catheters accommodate an extra channel for irrigation within a similar external diameter.

The French gauge was devised by Joseph-Frédéric-Benoît Charrière, a 19th-century Parisian maker of surgical instruments, who defined the "diameter times 3" relationship.

Size correspondence

See also 
 American wire gauge
 Birmingham gauge

References

Catheters
Tubing (material)